Boquerón   is a corregimiento in Boquerón District, Chiriquí Province, Panama, near the volcano of Volcán Barú. It is the seat of Boquerón District. Its population as of 1990 was 2,478; its population as of 2000 was 3,065.

References

Corregimientos of Chiriquí Province